Fort Wayne Roller Derby (FWRD) is an Open Gender flat track roller derby league based in Fort Wayne, Indiana. Founded in 2005 originally as Fort Wayne Derby Girls, the league currently consists of a women’s team and an open gender team that compete against teams from all over the United States and Canada. Fort Wayne Roller Derby is a member of the Women's Flat Track Derby Association (WFTDA).

History
FWDG was the first flat track roller derby league in Indiana, founded in October 2005 by Danielle Nicolette (Abbott), who skates under the derby name "Little D Evil" and Tonya Vojtkofsky, who skated as "Minx", after they saw the Rat City Rollergirls in Seattle.

The league played its first exhibition bout in May 2006, to a crowd of 1,200 fans. According to Amber Recker, the first skater to respond to Minx's call for a new team, "We kind of had to get butts in seats by playing up the fighting and more of the sexy aspect of it. As we've evolved... we're much more sports driven". FWDG first played a team from another league in January 2007, when it took on the Gem City Rollergirls, and, in the same month, it joined the Women's Flat Track Derby Association, (and was announced as a new member by the WFTDA in May 2007) and by the end of the year was ranked 29th in the WFTDA.

In 2009, it formed a B team, scrapping its intraleague teams. In 2013, Fort Wayne hosted a WFTDA Division 1 Playoff at the Allen County War Memorial Coliseum.

FWDG hosts the annual Spring Roll tournament, featuring women's, men's and junior roller derby games.

WFTDA competition
While Fort Wayne has hosted a WFTDA Playoff tournament they have yet to qualify to compete at one.

Rankings

In the community
The league also focuses on charitable fundraising, and had donated more than $26,000 to charities by June 2008, and $110,000 by September 2013.

References

Sports in Fort Wayne, Indiana
Roller derby leagues established in 2005
Roller derby leagues in Indiana
2005 establishments in Indiana